The 2020 Finnish Athletics Championships was the year's national outdoor track and field championships for Finland. It was held on 13–16 August at the Paavo Nurmi Stadium in Turku.

Results

Men

Women

References

External links
 Finnish Athletics Federation website

Finnish Athletics Championships
Finnish Athletics Championships
Finnish Athletics Championships
Finnish Athletics Championships
Sports competitions in Turku